Eshratabad (also Romanized as ‘Eshratābād; also known as Nowzad) is a village in Pain Velayat Rural District, in the Central District of Kashmar County, Razavi Khorasan Province, Iran. At the 2006 census, its population was 1,272, in 347 families.

References 

Populated places in Kashmar County